Ed Gonzalez is an American law enforcement officer and has served as the 30th sheriff of Harris County, Texas since January 2017. Gonzalez was the nominee for director for U.S. Immigration and Customs Enforcement until he withdrew the nomination in June 2022.

Early life and education 
Gonzalez is a native of Houston, Texas. He earned a Bachelor of Science degree from the University of Houston–Downtown and a Master of Science from the University of St. Thomas.

Career 
Gonzalez worked as an officer in the Houston Police Department for 18 years. He was elected to the Houston City Council in 2009 and served until 2016. Representing District H, Gonzalez was also vice mayor pro tempore from 2010 to 2012. Gonzalez assumed office as the 30th sheriff of Harris County, Texas in January 2017.

Immigration policy
Gonzalez has been critical of former President Donald Trump's immigration policies.  In 2017, Gonzalez ended a partnership with ICE—which his department had participated in since 2008—where ten specially-trained Harris County officers were assigned to determine the immigration status of suspects in the Harris County jail. The officers were re-deployed. That same year, Gonzalez opposed a proposed state law banning sanctuary cities for illegal immigrants, and requiring local officials to cooperate with federal immigration authorities.  In 2018, Gonzalez criticized US immigration policy, saying "children should not be in immigration detention", and "I do not support #ICERaids that threaten to deport millions of undocumented immigrants".  In 2019, Gonzalez barred his officers from participating in raids by ICE to detain and deport illegal immigrants.

Bail
In 2017, Gonzalez testified against Harris County in federal court, saying "When most of the people in my jail are there because they can't afford to bond out, and when those people are disproportionately Black and Hispanic, that's not a rational system".  At the beginning of the COVID-19 pandemic, Gonzales proposed that bail be waived "for many of the eight thousand inmates in the Harris County jail".

Gun legislation
In 2021, Gonzalez opposed a constitutional carry gun bill which would allow Texans to carry guns without permits.

Nomination to director of ICE
In 2021, Gonzalez was nominated to be director of U.S. Immigration and Customs Enforcement. After he was nominated, allegations of domestic abuse by his wife came to light in a 2021 police affidavit report. Both Gonzalez and his wife denied that an incident had occurred. After it became clear that the nomination was doomed due to multiple democratic senators remaining undecided on the nomination, Gonzalez withdrew himself from consideration stating that he would continue to serve as Harris county sheriff.

References 

Living people
People from Houston
University of Houston–Downtown alumni
University of St. Thomas (Texas) alumni
Texas sheriffs
Biden administration personnel
Houston City Council members
Texas Democrats
Year of birth missing (living people)